It's About Time is the debut studio album by American female R&B trio SWV. It was released by RCA Records on October 27, 1992, in the United States. It earned 11 Billboard Music Award nominations and became the 16th best-selling album of 1993 in the United States, with 2,100,000 copies sold according to Nielsen SoundScan. It also earned SWV a nomination for Best New Artist at the 36th Grammy Awards. In 1996, It's About Time was certified 3× platinum, for shipping over 3,000,000 albums in the US alone.

The album spawned five hit singles with "I'm So into You", "Downtown", "Weak", a remixed version of "Right Here/Human Nature" (the latter two reached number one on the R&B singles chart, with "Weak" being their biggest and only number-one pop hit), and "You're Always on My Mind" (shortened to "Always on My Mind" for single release). A remixed version of "Anything" appeared on the soundtrack of the film Above the Rim in 1994 and was released as the final single from It's About Time.

Critical reception

In his retrospective review for AllMusic, editor Ron Wynn wrote that SWV's "deep, sensual harmonies, sometimes naughty lyrics and aggressive style immediately struck a responsive chord, particularly among male fans. Their CD shows their versatility, as they handled New Jack tunes, romantic ballads [...] and sassy, innuendo-laden fare [...] Their hits "Weak" and "Right Here" had the same blend of heat and vulnerability that underscore the best En Vogue material, and even though this CD was padded by remixes and repeats, it was still among the finest debuts issued in 1992." Less enthusiastic, Amy Linden from Entertainment Weekly found that "in a perfect world, folks would demand more than the ability to program a slammin' beat and hit the note. Until that day, these chirpy homegirls of SWV create and fill their own void in It’s About Time."

Track listing

*Initially issued without track 15, but was added to all subsequent CDs in April 1993
*Copies of the album with the catalog number BMG 66074 contain "Right Here (Vibe Mix)" (4:18), as the final track

Charts

Weekly charts

Year-end charts

Certifications

Release history

References

1992 debut albums
SWV albums
RCA Records albums